Leslie Ronald Joslin (born 13 December 1947) is a former Australian cricketer who played in one Test in 1968.

Life and career
A hard-hitting left-handed middle-order batsman, Joslin was a champion schoolboy cricketer at University High School. In 1966–67, his first season for Victoria, he made 525 runs at an average of 43.75, helping Victoria win the Sheffield Shield. He hit his first first-class century, 126, against Western Australia while he was still only 18, adding 107 for the fourth wicket with his captain, Jack Potter. His other century, 121 not out, came in 1967–68, when he and Potter added 177 for the fourth wicket in 130 minutes against New South Wales. He was included in the team for the Fourth Test against India in Sydney, but made only 7 and 2, dismissed both times by the Indian spinners.

Joslin finished the 1967–68 season with 565 runs at 51.36, and was selected to tour England. In 13 first-class matches on the tour he made only 344 runs at 21.50, and was never in the running for a Test spot. On his return to Australia he played the 1968–69 season and most of the 1969–70 season, but never regained his earlier form and lost his place in the Victorian side, having played his last match not long after turning 22.

After his cricket career ended, Joslin worked in the tobacco industry, and then for a stud-breeding operation in harness-racing.

See also
 List of Victoria first-class cricketers

References

External links
 
 Les Joslin at CricketArchive

1947 births
Living people
People educated at University High School, Melbourne
Australia Test cricketers
Victoria cricketers
Australian cricketers
Cricketers from Melbourne
People from Yarraville, Victoria